"Aga siis" is a song performed by Estonian singer Jüri Pootsmann. The song was released as a digital download on 13 November 2015 through Universal Music Group as the second single from his self-titled extended play. The song peaked at number 1 on the Estonian Airplay Chart.

Track listing

Chart performance

Release history

References

2015 songs
2015 singles
Jüri Pootsmann songs